The League of Nations Codification Conference was held in The Hague from 13 March to 12 April 1930, for the purpose of formulating accepted rules in international law to subjects that until then were not addressed thoroughly. The conference's main achievement was the conclusion of the first international convention on the conflict of nationality laws.

Background
On 22 September 1924 the General Assembly of the League of Nations passed a resolution providing for the establishment of a 17-member committee for formulating a comprehensive system of international law on all outstanding issues. The committee's work led to the convening of the conference in 1930.

Work done by the conference
The conference dealt eventually with three main issues on its agenda:
 Nationality laws of various states.
 Territorial waters.
 Responsibility of states for damage done in their territory to the person or property of foreigners.

Due to disagreements on most issues on the agenda, only the Convention on Certain Questions Relating to the Conflict of Nationality Laws could be agreed upon by the states that took part in the conference.

Legacy of the codification conference
The legal interest of bringing about the codification of international law continued after the 1930 conference. The failure of that conference motivated the founders of the United Nations Organization to strive for a permanent commission to that end, which led to the establishment of the International Law Commission.

The failure of the 1930 conference served to remind the members of the new commission to proceed cautiously with the codification of international law through a longer and more gradual process.

Notes

External links
 A UN study elaborating on the codification of international law
 Harvard University draft on the convention on nationality laws, prepared for the conference, 1929
 1st report of the preparatory committee for the codification conference, 13 March 1930
 Text of the Convention on Certain Questions Relating to the Conflict of Nationality Laws, 12 April 1930
 UN memorandum from 1953 analyzing the effects of the 1930 convention on nationality laws
 Study on codification of international law

International law
League of Nations
1930 in international relations
Diplomatic conferences in the Netherlands
International commissions
20th-century diplomatic conferences
1930 conferences
20th century in The Hague
Codification of law